Riders in the Sky is a 1949 American Western film directed by John English and starring and co-produced by Gene Autry; featuring Gloria Henry, and Pat Buttram. Based on the song by Stan Jones, the film is about a murder, of which rancher Ralph Lawson (Steve Darrell) is accused, and Gene Autry attempting to clear his name.

Cast
Gene Autry as Gene Autry
and Champion World's Wonder Horse
Gloria Henry as Anne Lawson
Mary Beth Hughes as Julie Stewart
Robert Livingston as Rock McCleary
Steve Darrell as Ralph Lawson
Alan Hale, Jr. as Marshal Riggs
Tom London as Old Man Roberts
Pat Buttram as Chuckwalla

Note: Character names are not indicated in on-screen credits

References

1949 films
1949 Western (genre) films
American black-and-white films
Films based on songs
Columbia Pictures films
American Western (genre) films
Films directed by John English
1940s English-language films
1940s American films